The  is a dam on the Sumata River, a tributary of the Ōi River, located in Kawanehon Town, Haibara District, Shizuoka Prefecture on the island of Honshū, Japan.

History
The potential of the Ōi River valley for hydroelectric power development was realized by the Meiji government at the start of the 20th century. The Ōi River was characterized by a high volume of flow and a fast current. Its mountainous upper reaches and tributaries were areas of steep valleys and abundant rainfall, and were sparsely populated. The British interests were bought out by 1921, and the company was renamed . As early as the late 1920s, developers began to turn their attention to various tributary streams of the Ōi River, especially the Sumata River, with its steep-sided gorge and considerable flow volume.

Construction work began on the Senzu Dam in 1930 and was completed by 1935 by the Hazama Corporation. Construction was facilitated by the Ōigawa Railway, which had been completed by 1927.

Senzu Dam is now operated and maintained by the Chubu Electric Power Company.

Design
The Senzu Dam is a solid core concrete gravity dam with dual spillways. When completed, it was the highest concrete gravity dam in central Japan, and won a design award from the Japan Civil Engineering Association. However, the designers did not take into account the high levels of silt and sedimentation in the Sumata River. By 2002, it was estimated that over 97.7% of the usable capacity of Senzu Dam was filled with mud, and must now be constantly dredged to permit flow of water for power generation.

Surroundings
Senzu Dam is located near Sumata Onsen and can be reached from Senzu Station on the Ōigawa Railway. The area is popular with mountain climbers heading towards the high peaks of the Minami Alps National Park.

See also

References

Notes

External links 

 , Photo page with data. (in Japanese)

Gravity dams
Dams in Shizuoka Prefecture
Hydroelectric power stations in Japan
Dams completed in 1935